B & B Motor Company Building is a historic auto showroom and service center located in Asheville, Buncombe County, North Carolina. It was built in 1925, and is a two-story reinforced concrete and structural clay tile building faced in brick.  It features limestone trim and a high decorated parapet.

It was listed on the National Register of Historic Places in 1979.

References

External links

Commercial buildings on the National Register of Historic Places in North Carolina
Commercial buildings completed in 1925
Buildings and structures in Asheville, North Carolina
National Register of Historic Places in Buncombe County, North Carolina